Battlantis (バトランティス), is a fixed shooter arcade game released by Konami in July 1987. Battlantis is a portmanteau of Battle of Atlantis. In Battlantis, players take control of Cripeuss III and attempt to defeat Asmodeus and the monsters invading his castle. Enemy formations are similar to those in Space Invaders and Galaga, with some monsters charging to the bottom of the screen. Occasionally, two monsters carrying an ark will cross the screen. Shooting this ark will drop a powerup, temporarily giving a more powerful shot. Once enemies reach the bottom, they fly sideways towards Cripeus III, making them nearly impossible to defeat unless the player has captured two power up, allowing sideways firing. There are 16 stages in total. After all 16 stages are cleared, there will be staff credits shown. After the credit rolls, the game will go into a second loop of 16 stages albeit slightly altered stage backgrounds, positions and boss designations. If a player manages to beat the second loop of 16 stages, then a staff credit from the first loop ending rolls and the game will end praising a player for accomplishing all.

In March 2010, it was included in the launch lineup of Microsoft's Game Room service for the Xbox 360 and Games for Windows – Live.

Reception 
In Japan, Game Machine listed Battlantis on their July 15, 1987 issue as being the twenty-third most-successful table arcade unit of the month.

References

External links

Battlantis at Arcade History

1987 video games
Arcade video games
Konami games
Fixed shooters
Konami arcade games
Video games developed in Japan